Saïd Ben Najem (born 21 May 1968) is a French boxer. He competed in the men's welterweight event at the 1992 Summer Olympics.

References

1968 births
Living people
French male boxers
Olympic boxers of France
Boxers at the 1992 Summer Olympics
Boxers from Paris
Welterweight boxers